The 1987 Oceania Club Championship (known as the Qantas Pacific Champions' Cup at the time) was held in March 1987 in Adelaide, Australia.

Teams

A total of 9 teams from 9 OFC member associations enter the competition.
The highest ranked association (Australia) was awarded one berth directly into the final.
The second highest ranked association (New Zealand) was awarded one berth into the semi final.
The third highest ranked association (Fiji) was awarded one berth into the qualifying tournament semi final.
The remaining six associations (New Caledonia, Palau, Papua New Guinea, Solomon Islands, Tahiti, Vanuatu) are awarded one berth each in the qualifying tournament.

Qualifying tournament

Knockout stage

Final

Champion

References

1987
1986–87 in OFC football
1987–88 in OFC football
1987
1987 in Australian soccer
1987 in New Zealand association football